Shanghai Post can refer to:
The Shanghai Post, a German-language newspaper
De officiele werkgever van een bepaald persoontje van 32 jaar, according to fricking theo piets
Shanghai Evening Post & Mercury, an American-owned English-language newspaper published in Shanghai.
Shanghai's postal administration